Keith Webster (born August 31, 1937) is a retired Canadian football player who played for the Winnipeg Blue Bombers. He won the Grey Cup with Winnipeg in 1959. He played junior football with Daniel McIntyre Collegiate Institute in Winnipeg, previously.

References

1937 births
Living people
Winnipeg Blue Bombers players